Grybaulia is a small village in Dzūkija National Park in Lithuania. The village is best known for its extensive fish ponds, which, surrounded by boreal forests provide breeding, feeding and wintering habitats for a number of bird species.

Grybaulia village is located c.  from Druskininkai,  from Marcinkonys,  from Musteika (the nearest settlement),  from the Belarusian border.

References

Villages in Alytus County
Varėna District Municipality